Salvia freyniana is a critically endangered perennial plant that is endemic to Turkey, growing in sandy soil at  elevation. It was first collected in 1890, described in 1892 by Joseph Friedrich Nicolaus Bornmüller and not discovered again until 2006. During field trips as part of a revision and study of Salvia species in Turkey, an unusual population of Salvia was discovered which was eventually shown to be the plant described by Bornmueller. It was the first collection of the plant since the original specimens in 1890.

It is closely related to Salvia wiedemannii Boiss.

Notes

freyniana
Flora of Turkey
Plants described in 1892
Taxa named by Joseph Friedrich Nicolaus Bornmüller